Marcel Lemoine (born 28 November 1933) is a Belgian footballer. He played in three matches for the Belgium national football team in 1966.

References

External links
 

1933 births
Living people
Belgian footballers
Belgium international footballers
Place of birth missing (living people)
Association football defenders